Do You Wanna Ride? is the debut album by American R&B singer Adina Howard. It was released by Mecca Don and EastWest Records on February 28, 1995. It features the gold-selling hit single "Freak like Me," which was later covered by Tru Faith & Dub Conspiracy in 2000 and by the Sugababes in 2002. Do You Wanna Ride? was certified gold by the Recording Industry Association of America (RIAA) on June 21, 1995.

Critical reception

AllMusic editor William Cooper called Do You Wanna Ride? a "lackluster debut release." He found that "there's not much to recommend [on] the album. The main problem with Do You Wanna Ride? is more work was put into the production than into the songwriting. The employment of several producers for various songs doesn't mask Adina Howard's inability to move beyond basic R&B bump-and-grind clichés [...] and her limited vocal range doesn't allow her to soar above the mediocre material."

Track listing

Notes
  denotes co-producer

Sample credits
"You Got Me Humpin'" contains a sample from "Humpin'" as performed by The Gap Band.
"If We Make Love Tonight" contains a sample from "Bumpy's Lament" as performed by Isaac Hayes.
"You Can Be My Nigga" contains a sample from "You Are My Starship" (1976) as performed by Norman Connors.
"It's All About You" contains a sample from "Nobody Beats the Biz" by Biz Markie and embodies portions of "Back Seat (of My Jeep)" by LL Cool J.
"Do You Wanna Ride?" embodies a portion of "Part Time Lover" as performed by H-Town.

Charts

Weekly charts

Year-end charts

Certifications

References 

1995 debut albums
Adina Howard albums
New jack swing albums